The 1997 World Cup of Golf took place 20–23 November at the Kiawah Island Golf Resort, Ocean Course in Kiawah Island, South Carolina, U.S. It was the 43rd World Cup. The tournament was a 72-hole stroke play team event (32 teams) with each team consisting of two players from a country. The combined score of each team determined the team results. Individuals also competed for the International Trophy. The prize money totaled $1,500,000 with $400,000 going to the winning pair and $100,000 to the top individual. The Irish team of Pádraig Harrington and Paul McGinley won by five strokes over the Scottish team of Colin Montgomerie and Raymond Russell. Colin Montgomerie took the International Trophy by two strokes over Alex Čejka.

Teams

Source

Scores
Team

Source

Sweden withdrew before the final round. Per-Ulrik Johansson had collapsed after the first round and then suffered another dizzy spell after the third round. Sweden were fourth after three rounds. Joakim Haeggman continued to compete in the individual competition.

International Trophy

Source

References

World Cup (men's golf)
Golf in South Carolina
World Cup golf
World Cup golf
World Cup golf